The Camber Railway was a  narrow gauge railway located on the Falkland Islands in the South Atlantic. It was one of the most southerly railways in the world. 

The Camber Railway was constructed to support the Admiralty wireless station, supplying coal to generators which powered the station.

History
There were two Kerr, Stuart and Company  "Wren" class 0-4-0 steam tank locomotives. The system fell into disuse after the wireless station was modernised. Parts of the infrastructure were used in the Falklands War; rails were taken for use in some defensive structures.

Fleet
 KS "Wren" class steam locomotives - 2 (KS 2388/15 and 2392/15)
 wooden wagon cars - 3
 steam crane (on flat car) - 1
 tipper wagon
 flat car wagon

Gallery

References

External links

 The Camber Railway, Falkland Islands - Britlink
Railways of the Far South: Falkland Islands and Camber Railway
 Historias poco conocidas: Un ferrocarril en las Malvinas

Rail transport in the Falkland Islands
2 ft gauge railways in the Falkland Islands
Stanley, Falkland Islands